Phrynobatrachus cornutus is a species of frog in the family Phrynobatrachidae.
It is found in Cameroon, Central African Republic, Republic of the Congo, Equatorial Guinea, and Gabon.
Its natural habitats are subtropical or tropical moist lowland forest, swampland, freshwater marshes, intermittent freshwater marshes, and heavily degraded former forest.
It is threatened by habitat loss.

References

cornutus
Amphibians described in 1906
Taxonomy articles created by Polbot
Amphibians of Cameroon
Amphibians of the Central African Republic
Amphibians of the Republic of the Congo
Amphibians of Equatorial Guinea
Amphibians of Gabon